Meseta is a partially collapsed volcanic vent of Volcán de Fuego.

Volcanoes of Guatemala